The 2014 Australia Day Honours were announced on 26 January 2014 by the Governor General of Australia, Quentin Bryce.

The Australia Day Honours are the first of the two major annual honours lists, announced on Australia Day (26 January), with the other being the Queen's Birthday Honours which are announced on the second Monday in June.

Order of Australia

Companion of the Order of Australia (AC)

General Division
Reference:

Military Division
Reference:

Officer of the Order of Australia (AO)

General Division
Reference:

Military Division
Reference:

Member of the Order of Australia (AM)

General Division

Military Division

Medal of the Order of Australia (OAM)

General Division
References:

Military Division
Reference:

Meritorious Service

Public Service Medal (PSM)

Australian Police Medal (APM)

Australian Fire Service Medal (AFSM)

Ambulance Service Medal (ASM)

Emergency Services Medal (ESM)

Gallantry, Distinguished and Conspicuous Service

Medal for Gallantry (MG)

Commendation for Gallantry

Bar to the Distinguished Service Cross (DSC and Bar)

Distinguished Service Cross (DSC)

Distinguished Service Medal (DSM)

Commendation for Distinguished Service

Bar to the Conspicuous Service Cross (CSC and Bar)

Conspicuous Service Cross (CSC)

Conspicuous Service Medal (CSM)

Meritorious Unit Citation

References

External links
Australian Honours Lists (archived 2016), www.gg.gov.au
Australian Honours Lists, www.gg.gov.au
Australian Honours Lists 1975–2013, www.gg.gov.au

Orders, decorations, and medals of Australia
2014 awards in Australia